Walter Hand (22 July 1847 – 2 May 1882) was an Australian cricketer. He played one first-class match for New South Wales in 1871/72.

See also
 List of New South Wales representative cricketers

References

External links
 

1847 births
1882 deaths
Australian cricketers
New South Wales cricketers